Balyktakh is the name of several rural localities in the Sakha Republic, Russia:

Balyktakh, Ust-Aldansky District, Sakha Republic, a selo in Nayakhinsky Rural Okrug of Ust-Aldansky District
Balyktakh, Megino-Kangalassky District, Sakha Republic, a selo in Meginsky Rural Okrug of Megino-Kangalassky District